CYA may stand for:

 California Youth Authority, now California Division of Juvenile Justice
 Canadian Yachting Association, now Sail Canada
 College Year in Athens, an U.S. study abroad program 
 Cover your ass, a defensive practice against legal penalties or criticism
 Cyanuric acid, a chemical compound 
 ya, meaning "radiocarbon years ago" in calibration of radiocarbon dates
 CYA, the IATA code for Antoine-Simon Airport, Haiti

See also

See You (disambiguation) (including "seeya")